American rock band Motion City Soundtrack recorded songs for six studio albums, various soundtracks, compilations, and non-album singles. The majority of the group's original material was written by vocalist and guitarist Justin Pierre. The band also recorded cover versions of other artists' songs at various points throughout their career, including by the Beatles, Limbeck, the Police, R.E.M., the Rentals, Rilo Kiley, Trampled by Turtles, and the Weakerthans. In all, the group recorded 107 songs, nine of which were covers.

Songs

References

General
 

Specific

External links
 Official website

Motion City Soundtrack